Firewheel Golf Park is a public golf course located in Garland, Texas. It is a regular host of the North Texas PGA Junior Championships and many other tournaments.

The section of Garland, Texas called Firewheel was created after this public golf course. Firewheel Town Center and many of the neighborhoods were built up around this golf course.

History
The Firewheel Golf Park golf course was built in 1983.

References

External links
 Firewheel Golf Park - official site
 Firewheel Golf Park - City of Garland, Texas
 Firewheel Golf Park - Review Site

Garland, Texas
Golf clubs and courses in Texas